The 25th Saturn Awards, honoring the best in science fiction, fantasy and horror film and television in 1998, were held on June 9, 1999.

Below is a complete list of nominees and winners. Winners are highlighted in bold.

Winners and nominees

Film

Television

Programs

Acting

Special awards
George Pal Memorial Award
 Ray Bradbury

Life Career Award
 James Coburn
 Nathan Juran

President's Award
 William Friedkin

Service Award
 David Shepard

References

External links
 Official website
 25th Saturn Awards at IMDb

Saturn Awards ceremonies
1998 awards
1998 film awards
1998 television awards